Christopher I of Baden (13 November 1453 – 19 April 1527) was the Margrave of Baden from 1475 to 1515.

Life 
Christopher was the eldest son of Charles I, Margrave of Baden-Baden and Catherine of Austria, a sister of Frederick III, Holy Roman Emperor.

He regained the territories that were lost by his father to the Palatinate and its allies. Christopher maneuvered to keep these territories united under his son and successor Philip I, but his efforts were thwarted by Louis XII of France.  In 1479, the seat of the Margraviate of Baden was moved from Hohenbaden Castle to New Castle of Baden-Baden which was built by him. 

In 1489 Christopher became a member of the Swabian League.  This was part of his efforts for peaceful coexistence with his neighbors (in particular with Württemberg and the cities of Weil and Strasbourg).  Within the protection of this South West German pact, Christopher advanced the internal development of his dominion.

Christopher's winegrowing law of 1495 was a major step in improving the quality of wine produced in Baden. His wife Ottilie was from a famous wine-making family in the Kraichgau, the Counts of Katzenelnbogen.

By 1503, Christopher was responsible for uniting all the Badener lands when the Baden-Sausenberg died without male heirs.  In 1515, before his death, he divided the Margraviate among his sons Philipp, Bernhard, and Ernst.  However, Philipp who had succeeded him died childless, and his share was passed down to his brothers Bernhard and Ernst.  Thus, Bernhard founded the so-called "Bernardine line" of Baden-Baden and Ernst founded the "Ernestine line" of Baden-Durlach.

Family and children

Margrave Christopher married on 30 January 1469 Ottilie of Katzenelnbogen (ca. 1451 – 15 August 1517), a granddaughter of Philipp I, Count of Katzenelnbogen. They had the following children:
 Ottilie (6 June 1470 – 1490), Abbess in Pforzheim
 Jakob (6 June 1471 – 27 April 1511, Cologne), Archbishop of Trier
 Marie (2 July 1473 – 9 January 1519); Abbess in Lichtenthal
 Bernhard III, Margrave of Baden-Baden (7 April 1474 – 29 June 1536)
 Charles (21 June 1476 – 7 October 1510), canon in Strasbourg and Trier
 Christopher (21 July 1477 – 29 March 1508), canon in Strasbourg and Trier
 Philipp (10 December 1478 – 17 September 1533); Margrave of Baden-Sponheim
 Rudolf (16 June 1481 – 23 September 1532), canon in Mainz, Cologne, Strasbourg and Augsburg
 Ernst, Margrave of Baden-Durlach (7 October 1482 – 6 February 1553)
 Wolfgang (10 May 1484 – 24 June 1522)
 Sibylle (26 April 1485 – 10 July 1518), married on 24 January 1505 to Philipp III, Count of Hanau-Lichtenberg
 Rosine (5 March 1487 – 29 October 1554), married:
 in 1503 to Count Franz Wolfgang of Hohenzollern;
 to Johann von Ow zu Wachendorf
 John (d. 19 June 1490)
 Beatrix (22 January 1492 – 4 April 1535), married in 1508 to Johann II, Count Palatine of Simmern
 George (1 July 1493 – 16 November 1493)

Ancestors

References

External links 
 Article in the ADB

Christopher 01
1453 births
1527 deaths
Burials at Stiftskirche, Baden-Baden
Medieval Knights of the Holy Sepulchre